The 2008 edition of the UCI Road World Championships Time Trial took place on September 25 in Varese, Italy.

Final classification

References

Men's Time Trial
UCI Road World Championships – Men's time trial